Committee on Government Operations may refer to:

 United States House Committee on Government Operations, defunct committee whose function is currently within purview of the United States House Committee on Oversight and Government Reform
 United States Senate Committee on Government Operations, defunct committee whose function is currently within purview of the United States Senate Committee on Homeland Security and Governmental Affairs